Theridula gonygaster is a species of cobweb spider in the family Theridiidae. It is found in Central and South America, Caribbean, has been introduced into SW Europe, the Congo, Madagascar, Seychelles, China, and Japan.

References

External links

 

gonygaster
Articles created by Qbugbot
Spiders described in 1873